The 2020–21 season was Wolfsberger AC's 90th season in existence and the club's ninth consecutive season in the top flight of Austrian football. In addition to the domestic league, Wolfsberger participated in this season's edition of the Austrian Cup and UEFA Europa League. The season covered the period from 5 July 2020 to 30 June 2021.

Players

First-team squad

Out on loan

Pre-season and friendlies

Competitions

Overview

Austrian Bundesliga

Regular stage

Results summary

Results by round

Matches
The league fixtures were announced on 9 July 2020.

Championship round

Results summary

Results by round

Matches

European competition play-offs

Austrian Cup

UEFA Europa League

Group stage

The group stage draw was held on 2 October 2020.

Knockout phase

Round of 32
The round of 32 draw was held on 14 December 2020.

References

External links

Wolfsberger AC seasons
Wolfsberger AC
Wolfsberger AC